Delta Phi Epsilon may refer to:

Delta Phi Epsilon (professional), the professional foreign service fraternity and sorority
Delta Phi Epsilon (social), a National Panhellenic Conference affiliated social sorority